Aurimas Kučys (born 22 February 1981) is a Lithuanian former professional football midfielder.

International career
Kučys has represented Lithuania at under-21 level. He has also made 17 appearances for the senior Lithuania national football team.

Personal life
His son Armandas Kučys is also a football player.

Playing career

* - played games and goals

Honours
Ekranas Panevezys
 A Lyga
 2005, 2010, 2011, 2012
 Lithuanian Football Cup
 2000, 2010, 2011

National Team
 Baltic Cup
 2005

References

External links

1981 births
Living people
Sportspeople from Panevėžys
Lithuanian footballers
Lithuania international footballers
Lithuanian expatriate footballers
FC Daugava players
FC Naftovyk-Ukrnafta Okhtyrka players
FK Daugava (2003) players
Expatriate footballers in Latvia
Expatriate footballers in Ukraine
Lithuanian expatriate sportspeople in Ukraine
Lithuanian expatriate sportspeople in Latvia
Association football midfielders